The , or NPR, was a lightly armed national police force established in August 1950 during the Allied occupation of Japan. On July 1, 1954, it was reorganized as the Japan Ground Self-Defense Force (JGSDF).

History

On the outbreak of the Korean War, many units of the United States Armed Forces stationed in Japan were transferred to South Korea for combat, and Japan was perceived as lacking defenses. Encouraged by the Supreme Commander for the Allied Powers (GHQ), the Japanese government in 1950 authorized the establishment of NPR, consisting of 75,000 men equipped with light infantry weapons. Personnel affairs of the NPR was taken charge of by GHQ's Government Section (GS) under Brigadier General Courtney Whitney while the efforts to establish and train the force was made by Civil Affairs Section Annex (CASA) under Major General Whitfield P. Shepard.

Given the legal status of police, the National Police Reserve was tasked with the duty to maintain public security under special conditions according to the National Police Reserve Order (Cabinet Order No. 260, 1950), while in terms of unit formation and equipment, it was a de facto military force modeled after the United States Army.

In October 1952, the NPR was expanded to 110,000 men and renamed as the National Safety Force (NSF).

On July 1, 1954, after the 1954 Self-Defense Forces Act [Act No. 165 of 1954] the National Security Board was reorganized as the Defense Agency, and the National Security Force was reorganized as the Japan Ground Self-Defense Force (postwar army branch of Japan), while the Coastal Safety Force (waterborne counterpart of the NPR) was reorganized as the Japan Maritime Self-Defense Force (postwar naval branch of Japan).

Ranks

Photos

See also

Japan Ground Self-Defense Force
Reverse Course

Notes and references
Notes

References

References 

Government paramilitary forces
History of the Japan Ground Self-Defense Force
Disbanded armies
20th-century military history of Japan
1950 establishments in Japan
1952 disestablishments in Japan
Defunct law enforcement agencies of Japan